9Live was a commercial German participation TV channel launched on 1 September 2001 and lasted until 9 August 2011. It originated from a channel called tm3. Most of its programming is lottery and quiz games, in which the viewer can participate over the phone. There were also talent formats like FLASH. Host Ricky Harris led through the show.

References

External links
Official Site 
Livestream  (In Germany, the time is UTC+1)
Abzocke mit undurchsichtigen Spielregeln? Critical clip as part of the ARD TV magazine plusminus 
article of "Report Mainz" about the planned show for the unemployed 

Defunct television channels in Germany
ProSiebenSat.1 Media
Phone-in quiz shows
Television channels and stations established in 2001
Television channels and stations disestablished in 2011
2001 establishments in Germany
2011 disestablishments in Germany